The Age of Legal Capacity (Scotland) Act 1991 (c.50) is an Act of the Parliament of the United Kingdom applicable only in Scotland. It replaced the pre-existing rule of pupillage and minority with a simpler rule that a person has full legal capacity at the age of 16.

Background 

Under the previous Scots law (derived from Roman law), a child to the age of 12 if female, or 14 if male, had legal status of "pupil" and was under legal control of an adult (usually parent or parents) deemed "tutor". From that age until the age of majority the child had legal status of a "minor", and might have a responsible adult deemed "curator" or have no responsible adult (being referred to as "fors familiated"). The Scottish age of majority was originally 21 until reduced to 18 by the Age of Majority (Scotland) Act 1969. Pupils lacked any capacity to enter into legal contracts. Minors had capacity to enter into contracts, which included the capacity to make a will, but subject to rights to have these reduced by a court in certain circumstances, and sometimes requiring their curators consent. The rules as to when contracts did or did not require consent, and which were potentially reducible by court were complex. The age to enter into marriage was originally the age of minority, but this was raised to 16 years by the Age of Marriage Act 1929, and confirmed in the Marriage (Scotland) Act 1977.

Act 
The Age of Legal Capacity (Scotland) Act 1991 (c.50) Act of the Parliament of the United Kingdom is applicable only in Scotland. It replaced the pre-existing rule of pupillage and minority with a simpler rule that a person has full legal capacity at the age of 16. Under the Age Legal Capacity Scotland Act 1991 the old rules and terms were replaced. The basic rule under the replacement regime is that under 16s have no legal capacity. This is qualified by section 2 which provides that under 16s can:

 enter into a contract of a kind commonly entered into by persons of their age group, and on terms which are not unreasonable;
 from age 12, make a Will, and are deemed to have capacity to instruct a lawyer to act on their behalf.

The right to consent to an adoption was also subsequently inserted into this section by the Children (Scotland) Act 1995.

In all other cases the legal Guardian of the under 16 has legal right to deal with all contractual and consent matters on the child's behalf.

From age 16 a person has full legal capacity to enter into any form of agreement. This subject to protection for younger persons by means of a right (under section 3) while under the age of 21, to have a contract made between the ages of 16 and 18 set aside as a "prejudicial transaction". The test is whether a reasonably prudent adult would not have entered into such a contract, and the person has been prejudiced by entering into that contract. Under section 4 a contract may be approved in advance by a court, in which case it cannot later be reduced. Contracts entered into in the course of the young person's business, or where they misrepresented their age also cannot be reduced.

There is also specific provision for persons having their birthday on 29 February; under section 6 they are treated as having their birthday on 1 March in every non-leap year for purposes of calculating their age.

See also 
 Age of majority
 Age of Majority (Scotland) Act 1969
 Capacity in Scots law

References

1991 in Scotland
United Kingdom Acts of Parliament 1991
Acts of the Parliament of the United Kingdom concerning Scotland
Capacity (law)
Children's rights in Scotland
Children's rights legislation
Juvenile law
Youth in Scotland
Youth rights in the United Kingdom